Gus Blackwell (born November 4, 1955) is an American politician from Laverne who served in the Oklahoma House of Representatives from the 61st district from 2002 to 2014.

Blackwell was accused of using state funds and campaign funds to pay for personal travel.  He was charged with 32 counts of perjury and embezzlement. In a plea bargain, he pled guilty to only one count, agreed to pay restitution and was sentenced to 5 years probation. (2017)

References

1955 births
Living people
Republican Party members of the Oklahoma House of Representatives